Route 73 is an east–west state highway in Connecticut connecting the town center of  Watertown to the Route 8 expressway in Waterbury via the village of Oakville. The road is classified as an urban principal arterial road and carries traffic volumes of about 16,400 vehicles per day.

Route description
Route 73 begins at an intersection with Route 63 in the town center of Watertown. It begins as Main Street, splitting off to the east from Route 63. It travels east southeast, crossing over Steele Brook, into the Oakville section of town. In Oakville, it has a junction with Buckingham Street, an unsigned state road linking Route 73 to Route 262. Route 73 soon enters the city limits of Waterbury as Watertown Avenue, crossing over Steele Brook again. East of the intersection with Irvington Avenue, Route 73 widens to four lanes. Route 73 ends as it merges with southbound Route 8 (at Exit 35).

History 
In 1922, the route between Watertown center and downtown Waterbury via the village of Oakville was designated as a secondary state highway known as State Highway 339. In the 1932 state highway renumbering, old Highway 339 was renumbered to Route 73. At that time, the Route 8 expressway had not yet been built and Route 73 had a slightly different alignment in Waterbury. Originally, Route 73 entered Waterbury on Watertown Avenue as it does today. However, east of Windsor Street, instead of heading directly onto the Route 8 expressway, Route 73 continued to follow Watertown Avenue southeast to West Main Street then turned east along West Main Street to end at the intersection with Thomaston Avenue, which was the original alignment of Route 8. In the 1960s, there were plans to build a short expressway connector between Route 8 in Waterbury and the Route 63/US 6 junction in Watertown. As part of this plan, a partial interchange was built for Route 73, which opened in 1968. Route 73 was soon relocated to the expressway approach and ramps. The original route into downtown Waterbury became an unsigned state highway with designation State Road 846. However, no additional construction or right of way acquisition has taken place since then and the Route 73 expressway had been removed from the state's long range transportation plans since the mid-1970s.

Junction list

References

External links

073
Transportation in New Haven County, Connecticut
Transportation in Litchfield County, Connecticut